Camarin Grae is the pen name of Marian Grace (born 1941), an American writer of lesbian-themed science fiction. She has been a three-time Lambda Literary Award nominee: The Secret in the Bird was a Lambda Literary Award for Lesbian Fiction nominee at the 1st Lambda Literary Awards in 1989, Slick was a nominee for Lesbian Mystery at the 3rd Lambda Literary Awards in 1991, and Stranded was nominated for Lesbian Science Fiction, Fantasy or Horror at the 4th Lambda Literary Awards in 1992.

Originally from Chicago, Illinois, Grace was educated in clinical psychology. She used the pen name, an anagram of her real name, to keep her writing separate from her professional career as a psychologist.

Works
The Winged Dancer (1983)
Soul Snatcher (1985)
Paz (1986)
The Secret in the Bird (1988)
Edgewise (1989)
Slick (1990)
Stranded (1991)
Wednesday Nights (1994)

References

American women psychologists
21st-century American psychologists
20th-century American novelists
20th-century American women writers
American science fiction writers
American women novelists
American lesbian writers
American LGBT novelists
Women science fiction and fantasy writers
Writers from Chicago
1941 births
Living people
Novelists from Illinois
21st-century American LGBT people
21st-century American women writers
20th-century American psychologists